The term "The City That Works" may refer to:

 Chicago
 Portland, Oregon
 Stamford, Connecticut
 Toronto